Mercy Johnson Okojie (born 28 August 1984) is a Nigerian actress, film director and film producer She went to a Rivers State Secondary School for her secondary education in addition to the Nigerian Navy Secondary School in Port Harcourt, Rivers State. Right after her secondary education, she auditioned for a role in the movie titled The Maid and subsequently acted in other movies such as Hustlers, Baby Oku in America,and War in the Palace.

Early life
Mercy Johnson Okojie hails from Okene in Kogi State. Born in Lagos State to a former naval officer, Daniel Johnson and his wife Elizabeth, she is the fourth child in the family of seven. She started her primary education in Calabar, Cross River State. Her father, being a naval officer, was later transferred to Lagos State, where she continued her education at the Nigerian Navy Primary School. She went to Rivers State Secondary School for her secondary education, in addition to the Nigerian Navy Secondary School in Port Harcourt, Rivers State.

Career
Right after her secondary education, she auditioned for a role in The Maid and subsequently acted in other movies such as Hustlers, Baby Oku in America, War in the Palace. In 2009, she won an award for Best Supporting Actress at the 2009 African Movie Award ceremony for her performance in the movie "Live to Remember", and Best Actress award at the 2013 Africa Magic Viewers Choice Awards for her role in the comedy movie Dumebi the Dirty Girl. In December 2011, she was listed as Google's most searched Nigerian celebrity, a position she also held in 2012. She is the Senior Special Assistant (SSA) to the Kogi state governor on entertainment, arts and culture. The post took effect on 1 April 2017.

Mercy Johnson was once banned from acting for being too expensive on 3 November 2013, the movie marketers of Nollywood threatened to prohibit her from the industry due to her high demands. She and co-Nollywood stars such as Genevieve Nnaji, Omotola Jalade Ekeinde, Richard Mofe Damijo, Emeka Ike, Ramsey Nouah, Nkem Owoh, Stella Damasus and Jim Iyke were prohibited from acting, for reportedly demanding outrageous pay raise per movie. However, the ban was lifted by marketers/producers on 9 March 2014, following an apology from the actress.

She made her debut as a film producer with The Legend of Inikpi.

Personal life
She married Prince Odianosen Okojie on 27 August 2011. The couple has four children.

Endorsement
In October 2019, Mercy Johnson signed an endorsement deal with Chi Limited's Prime brand, Hollandia Evap Milk. She also became a brand ambassador for Pennek Nigeria Limited, a real estate investment company based in Lagos.

Filmography
Mercy Johnson Okojie has acted in more than 100 movies since joining the industry and continues to work as a producer, director and actress.

Awards and nominations

See also 
 List of Nigerian actresses

References

External links
 
 
https://www.facebook.com/MercyJohnsonOkojie/
https://twitter.com/realmercyj

Nigerian film producers
Living people
1984 births
21st-century Nigerian actresses
Best Supporting Actress Africa Movie Academy Award winners
Actresses from Lagos
People from Kogi State
Nigerian politicians
Nigerian actresses